The Journal of Proteomics is a peer-reviewed scientific journal published by Elsevier. It is the official journal of the European Proteomics Association and the editor-in-chief is Juan Calvete. It was established in 1979 as the Journal of Biochemical and Biophysical Methods, obtaining its current name in 2008. According to the Journal Citation Reports, the journal has a 2018 impact factor of 3.537.

References

External links 
 

Elsevier academic journals
English-language journals
Proteomics journals
Publications established in 1979